Molecular xenomonitoring (MX) is a disease surveillance technique that involves the collection and testing of hematophagous insects (such as mosquitoes, flies or ticks) to detect the DNA or RNA of a pathogen or parasite of human or animal health importance. The presence of pathogen genetic material in the insects may be used as a non-invasive proxy for infection in the human or animal population. Molecular xenomonitoring has been successfully used for the surveillance of the neglected tropical diseases lymphatic filariasis and onchocerciasis, amongst others.

References 

Medical monitoring